Moses ben Joseph ben Merwan ha-Levi (Also known as Moses Halavi) flourished about the mid-12th century and was a prominent Provençal rabbi, Philosopher, and Talmudist.

Biography
He was a nephew and pupil of Isaac ben Merwan ha-Levi. His colleagues addressed him as "Great scholar, Nasi Rabbi Moses," and his ritual decisions and Talmudic comments are often quoted.

He directed the yeshivah at Narbonne, several of his pupils subsequently achieving fame. Abraham ben David of Posquières and Zerahiah Gerondi were among his pupils. He was in continuous correspondence with his younger colleague Abraham ben Isaac, av bet din, who was his pupil and who by preference sought Moses' advice in difficult casuistic questions.

He was well regarded  by several Rabbis such as: Isaac Abarbanel, Hasdai Crescas, and Joseph Albo (all of which quote him).

Jacob ben Moses of Bagnols quotes a document relating to a divorce drawn up at Narbonne in 1134 and signed by the "great rabbi Moses ben Joseph and by Eliezer ben Zechariah." Gross identifies this Moses ben Joseph with Moses ben Joseph Merwan. If this identification is correct, Moses was one of the foremost cabalists of southern France, as Jacob's words in the passage cited indicate, although Moses is not otherwise known as a mystic.

Works 

 Ma'amar Elohi: A treatise encompassing the motion of 'the outermost sphere' and the First Cause. Originally written in Arabic in Seville. He relied exclusively on Islamic philosophers like Al-Farabi and Averroes. Three manuscripts exist.

See also

 Hachmei Provence

References

Henri Gross, Gallia Judaica, p. 413.

12th-century French rabbis
Provençal Jews
Clergy from Narbonne
Levites
French Orthodox rabbis